Katrina L. Asay (born November 8, 1957) is an American politician of the Republican Party. She was a member of the Washington House of Representatives, representing Washington's 30th legislative district, from 2010 to 2013.

References

Republican Party members of the Washington House of Representatives
Living people
Women state legislators in Washington (state)
1957 births
21st-century American women politicians
21st-century American politicians
20th-century American women politicians
20th-century American politicians
People from Milton, Washington
Heald College alumni